The Grêmio Recreativo Escola de Samba Estácio de Sá is one of the most traditional samba schools of the city of Rio de Janeiro. It has won once the top-tier Rio parade in 1992.

History 

Founded in 1928 with name of Deixa Falar, coming from the same neighborhood and is considered by some researchers of samba as a single block, was in fact the first school of samba, because its components taught and difundiam samba, the school marched up to 1933. however twenty years later came the Unidos de São Carlos.

With the merger of the old samba schools heirs of Deixa Falar. Meanwhile, the Unidos de São Carlos always stayed in intermediate positions Special and often semprede in the access and sambas considered of better quality, as the Círio de Nazaré  and Arte negra na legendária Bahia. In 1986, with change to neighborhood where is the school.

In 1986, with the change to the neighborhood where is the school. The thing moved and getting in good placings in the elite of samba and its greatest glory, was in the 1992 with plot Paulicéia Desvairada - 70 anos de Modernismo developed by Mário Monteiro and Chico Spinoza parade of surprising and that made Sapucaí move at the pace of the battery.

However the school dropped again getting in intermediate positions, culminating in his relegation to access in of 1997 on his return to the access had good and bad moments, where this time fell to the Group B. more in 2005, with the reprint of his theme of 1976 (Arte negra na legendária Bahia). Estácio won the title of Group B.

In 2006, back the group school was taken over by already established carnival producer Paulo Barros and two more Members winning group A with a new edition of the story Quem é Você? with of easy reading and after 10 years he returned in Special, with more a reprint, which was not very well, returning to access.

However, after more than nine years in access the Estácio is once more champion, with a plot on the Porto Maravilha and on his return to the particular a beautiful tribute to São Jorge which marked the returned Chico Spinoza and Wander Pires, being an interpreter, the school over a spool.

Segments

Presidents

Battery

Classifications

References 

Samba schools of Rio de Janeiro
1928 establishments in Brazil